WKZF (102.3 MHz is a commercial FM radio station licensed to Morton, Illinois, and serving the Peoria metropolitan area.  It broadcasts a Rhythmic Classic Hits radio format and is owned by Midwest Communications, Inc.  The radio studios and offices on the 12th floor of The Civic Center Plaza Building in Downtown Peoria.

History

Through most of the 1980s and 1990s, WTAZ had a talk format featuring personalities such as G. Gordon Liddy, Rush Limbaugh, Dr. Laura, and Art Bell. On June 14, 1999, those shows and call letters were moved to 1350 AM, and 102.3 became WFXF-FM, broadcasting Howard Stern in the morning, and classic rock. In October 2000, Stern was dropped, and WFXF-FM began playing classic hits. 

In late 2005, WDQX was sold, along with WXCL, to JMP, a subsidiary of Triad Broadcasting. WDQX kept a classic rock format, but was rebranded as "Max FM", and the music was tweaked to include more hard rock. Effective May 1, 2013, Triad sold WPBG and 29 other stations to L&L Broadcasting for $21 million. L&L would merge with Alpha Media in April 2014.

On October 15, 2014, WDQX owners Alpha Media announced 102.3 would flip to CHR as "Energy 102.3" at 9 a.m. the following day. The last song on "Max FM" was "Happy Trails" by Van Halen, while the first song on Energy was "Break Free" by Ariana Grande. On October 24, WDQX changed its call letters to WNGY to go with the "Energy" branding.  "Energy" never fared well in the Nielsen ratings for the Peoria market, barely ever getting above a 2.0 share in its nearly 2-year existence (the last being a 2.1 share in the Spring 2016 books).

"Energy" would continue until September 16, 2016 at 5 p.m., when, after playing "Treat You Better" by Shawn Mendes, WNGY flipped to classic hip hop, branded as "G102.3". The first song on "G" was "Hypnotize" by The Notorious B.I.G.

On February 4, 2019, Alpha Media announced that it would sell its Peoria cluster to Midwest Communications for $21.6 million. The sale closed on April 30, 2019.

On December 9, 2019, at 10 a.m., WNGY began stunting with a loop of David Bowie's "Changes". At noon, the station flipped to rhythmic classic hits as "KZ102.3" (with the WKZF call letters taking effect the same day), thus bringing back the "KZ" branding that was last used at sister WPBG from 1977 to 1994 when it was WKZW (its early incarnation was Rock-leaning Top 40 before shifting to Mainstream Top 40 in the early 1980s until its flip to Adult Top 40 in April 1994).

Previous logos

References

External links

KZF
Radio stations established in 1976
1976 establishments in Illinois
Midwest Communications radio stations
Rhythmic adult contemporary radio stations